Sandra Lee Bartky (née Schwartz; May 5, 1935 – October 17, 2016) was a professor of philosophy and gender studies at the University of Illinois at Chicago.  Her main research areas were feminism and phenomenology.  Her notable contributions to the field of feminist philosophy include the article, "Toward a Phenomenology of Feminist Consciousness". Sandra Lee Bartky died on October 17, 2016 at her home in Saugatuck, Michigan at age 81.

Education 
Bartky held a BA, MA and PhD from the University of Illinois Urbana-Champaign, and studied at University of Bonn, University of Munich, and the University of California, Los Angeles (UCLA). In 1997, Bartky received an honorary degree, Doctor of Humanities, from New England College.

Career 
Sandra Lee Bartky published a book entitled Femininity and Domination which contains one of her most quoted works, "Foucault, Femininity and the Modernization of Patriarchal Power".

In 1971 Bartky also helped found the Gender and Women’s Studies Program for the University of Illinois (Chicago) and the Society for Women in Philosophy.

Foucault, Femininity, and the Modernization of Patriarchal Power 
Feminist Sandra Lee Bartky wrote an article, “Foucault, Femininity, and the Modernization of Patriarchal Power” in 1988, detailing societally accepted “norms” for a woman’s body and behavior and makes the point that women are often judged for their size and shape because their bodies reflect their personality and nature. Using this information, she explains her idea that the “ideal body of femininity is constructed” and states that this perfect woman reflects the cultural obsessions and preoccupations of that society.

Bartky explains that the body of the ideal female varies with time and is dependent on culture. In today’s society, the ideal body is one that is “taut, small-breasted, narrow-hipped, and of a slimness bordering on emaciation” or that of a newly pubescent girl. This look of fragility and lack of muscular strength allows women to have an image of powerlessness, obedience, and subservience to men. They are expected to follow a strict diet, monitor their hunger to maintain their size and shape, exercise to “build the breasts and banish cellulite” and “spot-reduce problem areas” such as thick ankles or thighs. Along with body image, women are also expected to participate in behaviors that allow them to maintain this image. Women are expected to always have soft, supple, hairless, and smooth skin, worry about their beauty, be hesitant to extend their body, have a graceful gait and a restricted posture, always avert their eyes, and appear small with hands folded and legs pressed together when they are sitting. “Under the current ‘tyranny of slenderness’ women are forbidden to become large or massive; they must take up as little space as possible.”

Using all these rules, Bartky argues that “femininity is something in which virtually every woman is required to participate” and if women don’t follow this strict methodology and violate these norms, they become “loose women.” She states that because the difference between men and women is not at all just sexual difference, femininity is constructed and by doing that society created a “practiced and subjected body on which an inferior status has been inscribed.” All these rules for the ideal feminine body reflect society’s obsession with keeping women in check so that men can appear more powerful. Bartky concludes that "The ... project of femininity is a "setup": it requires such radical and extensive measures of bodily transformation that virtually every woman who gives herself to it is destined in some degree to fail."

Feminist Involvement 
In 1977, Bartky became an associate of the Women's Institute for Freedom of the Press (WIFP). WIFP is an American nonprofit publishing organization. The organization works to increase communication between women and connect the public with forms of women-based media.

Published works

Books

Chapters in books

Journal articles

External links
 
 Quotes by Sandra Bartky.
 Sandra Lee Bartky Papers - Pembroke Center Archives, Brown University

References

1935 births
2016 deaths
Feminist philosophers
Ludwig Maximilian University of Munich alumni
University of Bonn alumni
University of California, Los Angeles alumni
University of Illinois Chicago faculty
University of Illinois Urbana-Champaign alumni
People from Saugatuck, Michigan